Stanford Solomon Penner (5 July 1921 – 15 July 2016) also known as Sol Penner, was a German-American scientist and engineer, a major figure in combustion physics, especially in rocket engines, and a founder of the Engineering program at University of California, San Diego. He obtained his PhD in 1946 from the University of Wisconsin–Madison under Farrington Daniels and Theodore von Kármán.

Biography 
Stanford S. Penner was born on July 5, 1921, in Unna, Germany, a small town in the North Rhine-Westphalia region of Germany. He moved to the U.S. when he was 15 and he earned his bachelor's degree in chemistry at Union College in New York in 1942. He obtained his PhD from the University of Wisconsin–Madison under the supervision of Farrington Daniels and Theodore von Kármán, specializing in the development of rocket engines, and became a researcher at Jet Propulsion Laboratory after finishing his doctorate.

After working as a research engineer at Jet Propulsion Laboratory from 1946 to 1950, he became the Professor of Jet Propulsion at Caltech from 1950 to 1964. At 1964, he came to UCSD as a founding chair of the UCSD's first engineering department. In 1972, he created the Center for Energy Research at UCSD as a place for researchers from across campus and around the world to come together to pursue critical, interdisciplinary energy research.

Penner died at his home in La Jolla on July 15, 2015, at the age of 95.

Research

Penner collaborated with Theodore von Kármán in the later years of von Kármán life for 15 years. The Kármán–Penner flux fraction, first introduced by Von Kármán and Penner in 1954, is the fraction of mass flux of a particular chemical species (it is used sometimes in place of species mass fraction). He has received numerous professional honors, including election to the National Academy of Engineering, the American Academy of Arts and Sciences, the International Academy of Astronautics; he has also been awarded the Distinguished Associate Award from the US Department of Energy and the Founders Award from the National Academy of Engineering.

Penner also founded two scientific journals: the Journal of Quantitative Spectroscopy and Radiative Transfer in 1960, serving as chief editor for over 30 years and in 1975 he founded Energy, An International Journal and of the (classified) Journal of Defense Research.

Publications
Penner has published around 320 journals in his lifetime and authored many books and monographs.

Books

See also
Forman A. Williams
Paul A. Libby

References

External links
 

1921 births
2016 deaths
Fluid dynamicists
German emigrants to the United States
Engineers from California
Union College (New York) alumni
University of Wisconsin–Madison alumni
University of California, San Diego faculty
California Institute of Technology faculty
Members of the United States National Academy of Engineering
Engineers from New York (state)
Fellows of the American Physical Society